Carmen R. Guerrero Pérez (born November 15, 1974) was the former Secretary of the Puerto Rico Department of Natural and Environmental Resources and as of June 2016, is the director of the Caribbean Environmental Protection Division of the Environmental Protection Agency.

Education 
Guerrero-Pérez obtained her Bachelor of Arts in Environmental Public Policy from the University of Michigan in Ann Arbor. She has a Master of Planning in Environmental Planning from the University of Puerto Rico Graduate School of Planning and a Master of Environmental Management from Yale School of Forestry and Environmental Studies in Connecticut. She also participated in sustainable development study programs in Costa Rica and at the University of California in Berkeley. She is a licensed professional planner in Puerto Rico.

Career 
Carmen returned to Puerto Rico to join the San Juan Bay Estuary as a Project Coordinator. For more than 15 years, she served as an environmental and conservation planner and consultant to numerous organizations and government entities, among them: Conservation Trust of Puerto Rico, El Yunque National Forest, Corporación del Proyecto ENLACE del Caño Martín Peña, University of Puerto Rico, Banco Popular Foundation, and The Nature Conservancy. Carmen founded an environmental nongovernmental organization that provided volunteer advisory services on environmental and sustainable development issues to local communities across Puerto Rico.

Environmental Protection Agency Caribbean Division
On May 19, 2016, Guerrero-Pérez was appointed director of the Caribbean Environmental Protection Division of the Environmental Protection Agency by the regional administrator Judith A. Enck.

Secretary of the Department of Natural and Environmental Resources 
On May 13, 2013, Guerrero-Pérez was unanimously confirmed as Secretary of Natural and Environmental Resources of Puerto Rico. As a secretary, she managed to increase the protection by law of the island's territory from 8% to 16%. She worked on initiatives such as the Model Forest, the karst area management plan, the protection by law of the Northeast Ecological Corridor, among others.

Model Forest 
Under her mandate, she succeeded in legislating Act 182-2014, known as the "Model Forest Act of Puerto Rico", the legislation creates a National Model Forest ecological corridor encompassing 390,000 acres, 31 municipalities, and interconnecting 19 protected natural areas. The purpose of the office is to protect and seek the sustainable development of the communities located in the geographic area of the Model Forest, through four fundamental principles of sustainability: local economic development, conservation of resources, education and participation of host communities.

References 

1974 births
Living people
 
University of Michigan School of Natural Resources and Environment alumni
Yale School of Forestry & Environmental Studies alumni